Sulu's at-large congressional district may refer to several instances when a provincewide at-large district was used for elections to Philippine national legislatures from the province of Sulu before 1987.

The single-member district was first created ahead of the 1935 Philippine legislative election following the 1934 constitutional convention where voters had been selected in electing a delegate for the province. Sulu had been admitted as a special province under the Department of Mindanao and Sulu since 1914 but was only previously represented through a multi-member delegation appointed by the Governor General covering all of Mindanao territory except Misamis and Surigao beginning in 1916. The district encompassed the entire territory of the Jolo and Tawi-Tawi island groups that was formerly known as the Sulu District and which was previously organized under Moro Province in 1903 from the same Spanish politico-military district (Distrito de Jolo) that existed since the Madrid Protocol of 1885. The Spanish district of Jolo was earlier represented in the Malolos Congress of the nascent First Philippine Republic by two delegates from Luzon.

Datu Ombra Amilbangsa of the Nacionalista Democrático was elected as the district's first representative in 1935 by a select group of electors composed of municipal and municipal district presidents, vice-presidents and councilors, among others. The first time a representative from the province was elected through popular vote was during the succeeding 1938 Philippine legislative election after the passage of Commonwealth Act No. 44 in 1936 which removed the restrictions on qualified voters in the former Bureau of Non-Christian Tribes-designated jurisdiction.

Sulu was also represented in the Second Republic National Assembly by two members during the Pacific War. It reverted to single-member representation for the restored Commonwealth and subsequent Third Republic House of Representatives. It continued to elect representatives until the dissolution of Congress in 1972. Following a shift to parliamentary system, districts were replaced by multi-member regional constituencies where Sulu, reduced to the Jolo island group following the separation of Tawi-Tawi in 1973, was represented as part of Region IX's at-large district. When provincial and city district representation was restored in 1984, Sulu was represented by one assemblyman, with a separate representation created for Tawi-Tawi. It was made obsolete by the 1987 reapportionment that established two districts in the province under a new constitution.

Representation history

See also
Legislative districts of Sulu
Legislative districts of Tawi-Tawi

References

Former congressional districts of the Philippines
Politics of Sulu
History of Tawi-Tawi
1935 establishments in the Philippines
1986 disestablishments in the Philippines
At-large congressional districts of the Philippines
Congressional districts of Bangsamoro
Constituencies established in 1898
Constituencies disestablished in 1901
Constituencies established in 1935
Constituencies disestablished in 1972
Constituencies established in 1984
Constituencies disestablished in 1986